Yoon Kyung-ho (born 5 July 1980) is a South Korean theatre, film and television actor. He debuted in 2002 in SBS's documentary drama Savage Age. He came into prominence in KBS's 2017 legal drama Witch at Court and tvN's 2019 TV series The Crowned Clown. He also appeared in 2012 historical comedy film I Am the King. In 2022, he is cast in JTBC's drama Cleaning Up.

Career
Yoon Kyung-ho debuted in the entertainment world in 2006 and appeared in small film roles. He debuted in television in 2014 and since then he appeared in supporting roles in Witch at Court (2017), I Picked Up a Celebrity on the Street (2018), The Dude in Me (2019), and Juror 8 (2019).

In 2022, he appeared in Netflix original web series All of Us Are Dead and The Sound of Magic. He is also cast in JTBC's TV series Green Mothers' Club and Cleaning Up, which is based on the 2019 British series of the same name.

Filmography

Films

Television series

Web series

Theater

Awards and nominations

References

External links
 
 
 Yoon Kyung-ho on Daum 
 Yoon Kyung-ho on Play DB
 Yoon Kyung-ho on KMDb

21st-century South Korean male actors
South Korean male television actors
South Korean male film actors 
Living people
1980 births
South Korean male stage actors